ARA Garibaldi was one of four  armored cruisers purchased by the Argentine Navy from Italy.

Design and description

She displaced  at normal load. The ship was powered by two vertical triple-expansion steam engines, each driving one shaft, using steam from eight Scotch marine boilers. Her complement consisted of 28 officers and 420 enlisted men.

Her main armament consisted of two 40-caliber Armstrong Whitworth  guns, in gun turrets fore and aft of the superstructure. The ten 40-caliber quick-firing (QF)  guns that comprised her secondary armament were arranged in casemates amidships on the main deck. Garibaldi also had six QF , ten QF 6-pounder Hotchkiss and eight QF 3-pounder Hotchkiss guns to defend herself against torpedo boats. She was also equipped with four above-water  torpedo tubes, two on each side.

The ship's waterline armor belt had a maximum thickness of  amidships and tapered to  towards the ends of the ship. Between the main gun barbettes it covered the entire side of the ship up to the level of the upper deck. The barbettes, the conning tower, and gun turrets were also protected by 5.9-inch armor.

Construction and career
The ship was launched on 27 May 1895 and she was stricken on 20 March 1934.

Notes

References

Further reading 
  Burzaco, Ricardo. Acorazados y Cruceros De La Armada Argentina. Eugenio B, Buenos Aires, 1997. 
 

Garibaldi-class cruisers of the Argentine Navy
Ships built in Genoa
1895 ships
Ships built by Gio. Ansaldo & C.